John Doe (masculine) and Jane Doe (feminine) are multiple-use placeholder names that are used in the United Kingdom and the United States when the true name of a person is unknown or is being intentionally concealed. In the context of law enforcement in the United States, such names are often used to refer to a corpse whose identity is unknown or unconfirmed. These names are also often used to refer to a hypothetical "everyman" in other contexts, in a manner similar to John Q. Public or "Joe Public". There are many variants to the above names, including John Roe, Richard Roe, Jane Roe, Baby Doe, and Janie Doe/Johnny Doe (for children).

In criminal investigation
In other English-speaking countries, unique placeholder names, numbers or codenames have become more often used in the context of police investigations. This has included the United Kingdom, where usage of "John Doe" originated during the Middle Ages. However, the legal term John Doe injunction or John Doe order has survived in English law and other legal systems influenced by it. Other names, such as "Joe Bloggs" or "John Smith", have sometimes been informally used as placeholders for an everyman in the UK, Australia, and New Zealand; however such names are seldom used in legal or police circles in the same sense as John Doe.

Well-known legal cases named after placeholders include:
 the landmark 1973 US Supreme Court decisions regarding abortion: Roe v. Wade ("Roe" being a pseudonym) and Doe v. Bolton (1973) and;
 the civil cases Doe dem. John Hurrell Luscombe vs Yates, Hawker, and Mudge (1822) 5 B. & Ald. 544 (England), McKeogh v. John Doe (Ireland; 2012) and Uber Technologies, Inc. v. Doe I (California, 2015).
Use of "John Doe" in the sense of an everyman, includes:
 the 1941 film Meet John Doe.

Use of "John Doe" in the sense of an unidentified man (anonymous), includes:
 the 1995 film Seven.

Use of "Jane Doe" in the sense of an unidentified corpse, includes:
 the 2016 film The Autopsy of Jane Doe.
Use of "John Doe" in the sense of a placeholder, includes:
 The Valve Steam Deck desktop mode default email (or any KDE Plasma 5 based Linux distro).

History
Under the legal terminology of Ancient Rome, the names "Numerius Negidius" and "Aulus Agerius" were used in relation to hypothetical defendants and plaintiffs.

The names "John Doe" (or "John Do") and "Richard Roe" (along with "John Roe") were regularly invoked in English legal instruments to satisfy technical requirements governing standing and jurisdiction, beginning perhaps as early as the reign of England's King Edward III (1327–1377). Though the rationale behind the choices of Doe and Roe is unknown, there are many suggested folk etymologies. Other fictitious names for a person involved in litigation in medieval English law were "John Noakes" (or "Nokes") and "John-a-Stiles" (or "John Stiles"). The Oxford English Dictionary states that John Doe is "the name given to the fictitious lessee of the plaintiff, in the (now obsolete in the UK) mixed action of ejectment, the fictitious defendant being called Richard Roe".

This usage is mocked in the 1834 English song "John Doe and Richard Roe":

This particular use became obsolete in the UK in 1852:

In the UK, usage of "John Doe" survives mainly in the form of John Doe injunction or John Doe order (see above).

Unlike the United States, the name "John Doe" does not actually appear in the formal name of the case, for example: X & Y v Persons Unknown [2007] HRLR 4.

Well-known cases of unidentified decedents include "Caledonia Jane Doe" (1979) and "Princess Doe" (1982), both of whom have been identified. The baby victim in a 2001 murder case in Kansas City, Missouri, was referred to as Precious Doe.

In 2009, the New York Times reported the difficulties and unwanted attention experienced by a man actually named John Doe, who had often been suspected of using a pseudonym. He had been questioned repeatedly by airport security staff. Another man named John Doe was often suspected of being an incognito celebrity.

Other variants
In cases where a large number of unidentified individuals are mentioned, numbers may be appended, such as "Doe #2" or "Doe II". Operation Delego (2009), which targeted an international child sexual abuse ring, cited 21 numbered "John Does", as well as other people known by the surnames "Doe", "Roe", and "Poe".

"John Stiles", "Richard Miles" have been used for the third and fourth participants in an action. "Mary Major" has been used in some federal cases in the US. "James Doe" and "Judy Doe" are among other common variants.

Less often, other surnames ending in -oe have been used when more than two unknown or unidentified persons are named in U.S. court proceedings, e.g., Poe v. Snyder, 834 F.Supp.2d 721 (W. D. Mich. 2011), whose full style is
 Jane Poe, John Doe, Richard Roe, Robert Roe, Mark Moe, Larry Loe, Degage Ministries, and Mel Trotter Ministries, Plaintiffs, v. Rick Snyder, Governor of the State of Michigan, Bill Schuette, Attorney General of the State of Michigan, Kriste Etue, Director of the Michigan State Police, William Forsyth, Kent County Prosecutor, in their official capacities, Defendants and;
 Friedman v. Ferguson, No. 87-3758, unpublished disposition, 850 F.2d 689 (4th Cir., 29 June 1988), whose full style is 
Wilbur H. Friedman, Plaintiff-Appellant, v. Thomas B. FERGUSON, Director, Department of Animal Control, a State Actor, In His Official and Individual Capacities; Brett Boe; Carla Coe; Donna Doe; Frank Foe; Grace Goe; Harry Hoe; State Actors, Advisors To Defendant Ferguson, In Their Official and Individual Capacities (identities currently unknown); Marta Moe; Norma Noe; Paula Poe; Ralph Roe; Sammy Soe; Tommy Toe; Private Individuals Who Conspired With the Foregoing State Actors (identities currently unknown); Roger W. Galvin, Chairman, Animal Matters Hearing Board; Vince Voe; William Woe; Xerxes Xoe; Members of the Animal Matters Hearing Board, State Actors, In Their Official and Individual Capacities (identities currently unknown), Defendants-Appellees.

In Massachusetts, "Mary Moe" is used to refer to pregnant women under the age of 18 petitioning the Superior Court for a judicial bypass exception to the parental consent requirement for abortion.
"Mary Moe" is also used to refer to such cases generally, i.e. "Mary Moe cases". Sometimes "Mary Doe" may be used for the individuals.

Parallels in other countries include:
 "Ashok Kumar" has been used in court cases in India;
 the abbreviation N.N., which is commonly used in European legal systems, as an abbreviation for Latin terms such as:
 nomen nescio ("I do not know the name") in Belgium, Germany, Italy and Serbia and; 
 nomen nominandum ("the name must be mentioned") in the Netherlands.
 Ploni, Almoni, or Ploni Almoni are used in Israel, the names originating in the Hebrew Bible. Israel Israeli is a newer variant, used in Israel today.

In 1997, New York City police discovered a decapitated body and were not able to find the killer. The body was named Peaches (murder victim) and also Jane Doe 3.

Famous court cases
 The landmark 1973 abortion cases Roe v. Wade and Doe v. Bolton get their names from anonymous plaintiffs later revealed to be, respectively, Norma McCorvey and Sandra Cano.
 A Toronto woman, publicly known only as Jane Doe, waged an 11-year court battle against the Toronto Police Service after being raped in 1986, alleging that the police had used her as bait to catch the Balcony Rapist. She won the case in 1998, and was named Chatelaine Woman of the Year that year. She published a book about her experience, The Story of Jane Doe: A Book about Rape, in 2003.
 A Doe subpoena is an investigatory tool that a plaintiff may use to seek the identity of an unknown defendant. Doe subpoenas are often served on online service providers and ISPs to obtain the identity of the author of an anonymous post.
Serial killer Richard Laurence Marquette confessed to the murder of an unknown woman identified only as Jane Doe.
File sharing websites were blocked in India on 21 July 2011 on some ISPs including Bharti Airtel, BSNL, and Reliance Communications, because Reliance BIG Pictures got a "John Doe" order from Delhi High Court allowing them to serve cease and desist notices on people illegally redistributing the film Singham. This allegedly brought down copyright infringement of the film by 30%.
On 29 August 2011, Reliance Entertainment procured a 'John Doe' order from the Delhi High Court to prevent the illegal broadcast or streaming of its upcoming film Bodyguard. This order gives protection to the intellectual property owner, Reliance Entertainment, from copyright violation by prospective anonymous offenders.

The use and selection of pseudonyms is not standardized in U.S. courts. The practice was rare prior to 1969, and is sometimes objected to on legal grounds. 

On 18 January 2015, a woman was sexually assaulted on the campus of Stanford University in California. The victim impact statement that the woman, referred to as Emily Doe in court documents, read at her assailant's sentencing hearing the following year went viral, and she was named a "woman of the year" by Glamour magazine. She publicly revealed her real name, Chanel Miller, in 2019.
On 10 March 2015, HTG Capital Partners LLC filed a federal lawsuit against unnamed "spoofers", whom the suit referred to as John Doe(s), in the hopes of getting a judge to force the Chicago Mercantile Exchange to reveal the names of the firms. HTG said it had found evidence of thousands of such manipulations over 2013 and 2014.
In November 2016, a woman only identified as "Jane Doe" abandoned plans to go public about allegedly being raped by Donald Trump.
In October 2017, an unidentified minor Jane Doe detained by U.S. Immigration and Customs Enforcement sued to enjoin the government from obstructing her access to abortion in Garza v. Hargan.
In March 2021, Justice Molloy of the Ontario Superior Court of Justice named a mass murderer, who was seeking notoriety, as John Doe  when reading a highly publicized court decision (R. v. Minassian, 2021 ONSC 1258).

See also

 Average Joe
 Alan Smithee
 Blackacre
 Foo
 Joe Bloggs
 Joe Shmoe
 Mr. X
 Rudolf Lingens
 The Autopsy of Jane Doe
 The man on the Clapham omnibus
 Tom, Dick and Harry
 List of placeholder names by language
 Somerton Man
 Murder of Vivianne Ruiz (Jane Doe)

References

External links
PDF Operation Delego indictment featuring twenty John Does. Accessed 8 January 2014.

Anonymity pseudonyms
Placeholder names